Marie Edith Borroff (September 10, 1923 – July 5, 2019) was an American poet, translator, and the Sterling Professor of English emerita at Yale University.

Life
Borroff was born in New York City in 1923, the daughter of professional musicians Marie Bergerson and (Albert) Ramon Borroff, and sister of composer Edith Borroff.  She graduated from the University of Chicago with a BA and MA in 1946, and from Yale University with a Ph.D. in 1956. In 1959, she became the first woman to teach in the English Department at Yale. In 1965, she was the first woman appointed to be an English professor. She retired in 1994.

An Endowed Chair at Yale has been named for her.

Works

References

External links
"Sir Gawain and the Green Knight (lines 1-19)", Norton Anthology of English Literature
Guest lecture on Wallace Stevens focusing on the poem The Auroras of Autumn (part of Open Yale Courses).
BorroffReadingGawain.com

University of Chicago alumni
Yale University faculty
Yale Sterling Professors
2019 deaths
Translators from Old English
American women poets
20th-century American poets
20th-century American translators
20th-century American women writers
Poets from New York (state)
Writers from New York City
21st-century American poets
21st-century American women writers
21st-century American translators
1923 births
Women medievalists
American women academics
Yale Graduate School of Arts and Sciences alumni